The 2016 Open Bogotá was a professional tennis tournament played on clay courts. It was the eleventh edition of the tournament which was part of the 2016 ATP Challenger Tour. It took place in Bogotá, Colombia between 7 and 13 November 2016.

Singles main-draw entrants

Seeds

 1 Rankings are as of October 31, 2016.

Other entrants
The following players received wildcards into the singles main draw:
  Daniel Elahi Galán
  Andrew Ely
  Lucas Koelle
  Carlos Salamanca

The following players received entry into the singles main draw with a protected ranking:
  Fabiano de Paula

The following player entered the main draw as an alternate:
  Facundo Mena

The following players received entry from the qualifying draw:
  Marcelo Tomás Barrios Vera
  Gonzalo Escobar 
  Nicolás Jarry
  Fernando Romboli

The following player received entry as a lucky loser:
  Alejandro Gómez

Champions

Men's singles

 Facundo Bagnis def.  Horacio Zeballos 3–6, 6–3, 7–6(7-4)

Men's doubles

 Marcelo Arévalo /  Sergio Galdós  def.  Ariel Behar /  Gonzalo Escobar 6–4, 6–1

Open Bogota
Seguros Bolívar Open Bogotá
2016 in Colombian tennis